Boada may refer to:

People
 Joan Boada, Cuban ballet dancer
 Lucas Boada, Cuban baseball player

Places
 Boada de Campos, a municipality in the province of Palencia, Castile and León, Spain
 , a village in Burgos province, Spain
 Boada, Salamanca, a municipality in Salamanca province, Spain

See also
Boado, Ourense, a place near Xinzo de Limia, Ourense province, Spain